
Gmina Świątniki Górne is an urban-rural gmina (administrative district) in Kraków County, Lesser Poland Voivodeship, in southern Poland.

Villages
Apart from the town of Świątniki Górne, Gmina Świątniki Górne contains the villages and settlements of Ochojno, Olszowice, Rzeszotary, Rzeszotary Górne, Wrząsowice and Zalesie.

Neighbouring gminas
Gmina Świątniki Górne is bordered by the city of Kraków and by the gminas of Mogilany, Siepraw and Wieliczka.

References
Polish official population figures 2006

Swiatniki Gorne
Kraków County